Sir Ector , sometimes Hector, Antor, or Ectorius, is the father of Sir Kay and the adoptive father of King Arthur in the Matter of Britain. Sometimes portrayed as a king instead of merely a lord, he has an estate in the country as well as properties in London.

Medieval portrayals 
Ector appears in the works of Robert de Boron and the Lancelot-Grail, as well as later adaptations such as the Post-Vulgate Cycle and Thomas Malory's Le Morte d'Arthur. In these versions, Merlin takes Arthur from his biological parents King Uther Pendragon and Igraine, and brings him to Ector's estate. Merlin does not reveal the boy's true identity, and Ector takes him on and raises him with Kay as his own son. When Kay is old enough to be knighted, Ector's young ward serves as his squire. In Malory's Le Morte d'Arthur, Ector also appears in the concluding book to recite a threnody lamenting Sir Lancelot's eventual death; however, the sole surviving manuscript of Mallory's work is missing the pages that would include this material, and at least one scholar has suggested that the speech may have been an addition by the text's printer, William Caxton.

In The Once and Future King T. H. White says his lands lie in the "Forest Sauvage"; some later writers have used this as well. 

In the earlier Welsh stories, the father of Kay (Cei) is instead named Cynyr (Kyner).

In other media
In the 1963 Walt Disney Studios animated musical-fantasy-comedy movie The Sword in the Stone, Sir Ector is voiced by actor Sebastian Cabot. He does not believe in magic until Merlin casts a blizzard before him, thus allowing the wizard to educate Arthur in the castle, even though Ector has forbidden it. He is extremely distrustful of magic and Merlin, whom he mistakenly refers to as Marvin. When he first allows Merlin to educate Arthur, Ector forces Merlin to reside in an old, dilapidated tower near the castle, in hopes of making Merlin want to leave. Ector often treats Arthur harshly and possesses a clear authority over him, treating him more as a servant, while doting on his birth son, Kay. However, he does care for Arthur, as shown in his first scene, where he scolds Kay for allowing Arthur to go into the forest alone and worried that he might be dead. He also appoints him as Kay's squire, and clearly has affection for Arthur, and does not always want to treat him poorly, but rather feels responsible for his welfare. After Arthur is revealed as the rightful King of England by pulling the sword from the stone, he immediately apologizes to Arthur for how he has treated him up to that point and bows in submission while sternly ordering Kay to also bow down to Arthur.
In the 1975 Monty Python film Monty Python and the Holy Grail Sir Ector is named as one of the knights killed by the Rabbit of Caerbannog.
In the 1981 epic fantasy film  Excalibur Sir Ector is portrayed by actor Clive Swift.
In the 2005-2009 comedy medieval fantasy television series Kaamelott Anton is a farmer portrayed by comedian Guy Bedos.
In the 2011 historical-fantasy-drama TV series Camelot Sir Ector is portrayed by actor Sean Pertwee.
In the 2020 fantasy drama TV series Cursed Sir Ector is portrayed by actor Peter Guinness.

References

Knights of the Round Table
Arthurian characters
Welsh mythology